EHM may refer to:

People 
 Erica Ehm (born 1961), Canadian writer and television personality
 Henrik Ehm (died 1701), Danish coppersmith and alchemist
 Marcus Ehm, German paralympic athlete
 Wilhelm Ehm (1918–2009), a German World War II naval officer and East German politician
 Ehm Welk (1884–1966), German writer and educator

Other uses 
 Cape Newenham LRRS Airport, in Alaska
 Eastside Hockey Manager, a video game series
 Eastside Hockey Manager (video game), a 2015 video game
 Erotic Heritage Museum, in Las Vegas, Nevada
 Extreme Home Makeover, an American television series
 Economic Hit Men, US state sponsored "hit men"whose job is to convince leaders of underdeveloped countries to accept substantial development loans for large construction and engineering projects. Ensuring that these projects were contracted to U.S. companies, such loans provided political influence for the US and access to natural resources for American companies,thus primarily helping rich families and local elites, rather than the poor.